Roger Feutmba (born 31 October 1968) is a Cameroonian former professional footballer who played as a midfielder. He was named in the Cameroon national team's squads for the 1990 FIFA World Cup, the 1990 African Nations Cup and the 1992 African Nations Cup.

During his time at Mamelodi Sundowns Feutmba won the PSL Players' Player of the Season award.

External links

References

Living people
1968 births
Footballers from Douala
Cameroonian footballers
Association football midfielders
Cameroon international footballers
1990 FIFA World Cup players
1992 African Cup of Nations players
Belgian Pro League players
Challenger Pro League players
South African Premier Division players
Union Douala players
K.V. Kortrijk players
Mamelodi Sundowns F.C. players
Cameroonian expatriate footballers
Cameroonian expatriate sportspeople in Belgium
Expatriate footballers in Belgium
Cameroonian expatriate sportspeople in South Africa
Expatriate soccer players in South Africa